William Tatham was an English professional association footballer who played as a goalkeeper.

References

Footballers from Burnley
English footballers
Association football goalkeepers
Burnley F.C. players
Bolton Wanderers F.C. players
Nelson F.C. players
English Football League players
Year of death missing
Year of birth missing